John Douglas "Jack" Dittmer (January 10, 1928 – May 31, 2014) was a Major League Baseball second baseman. He played six seasons in the majors, from  until , for the Boston / Milwaukee Braves and Detroit Tigers.

As an amateur, Dittmer was a three-sport star at Elkader High School, where he played basketball, baseball, and football. In Dittmer's senior year of high school, he was selected the best high-school baseball player in the state of Iowa, and he went on to play in a National All-star Game. He continued to play all three sports at the University of Iowa, where he was mainly known as a wide receiver. Dittmer was inducted into the University of Iowa Athletics Hall of Fame in 1993.

References

External links

Retrosheet
9-Time Letterwinner Jack Dittmer Passes Away

1928 births
2014 deaths
Atlanta Crackers players
Baseball players from Iowa
Birmingham Barons players
Boston Braves players
Denver Bears players
Detroit Tigers players
Iowa Hawkeyes baseball players
Iowa Hawkeyes football players
Iowa Hawkeyes men's basketball players
Major League Baseball second basemen
Milwaukee Braves players
Milwaukee Brewers (minor league) players
People from Elkader, Iowa
Phoenix Giants players
Sacramento Solons players
Seattle Rainiers players
University of Iowa alumni